Daniel Levine may refer to:
 Daniel Levine (composer), musical theater composer
 Daniel Levine (actor), Broadway actor

See also
 Daniel Levin (disambiguation)